Hemeroplanis is a genus of moths of the family Erebidae. The genus was erected by Jacob Hübner in 1818.

Taxonomy
The genus has previously been classified in the subfamily Phytometrinae within Erebidae or in the subfamily Calpinae of the family Noctuidae.

Species
 Hemeroplanis habitalis Walker, 1859 – black-dotted hemeroplanis moth
 Hemeroplanis historialis Grote, 1882 (syn: Hemeroplanis finitima J. B. Smith, 1893, Hemeroplanis secundalis J. B. Smith, 1907)
 Hemeroplanis immaculalis Harvey, 1875
 Hemeroplanis incusalis Grote, 1881
 Hemeroplanis obliqualis H. Edwards, 1886
 Hemeroplanis parallela J. B. Smith, 1907
 Hemeroplanis punitalis J. B. Smith, 1907
 Hemeroplanis rectalis (Smith, 1907)
 Hemeroplanis reversalis J. B. Smith, 1907
 Hemeroplanis scopulepes Haworth, 1809 – variable tropic moth
 Hemeroplanis trilineosa (Dyar, 1918)

References

Boletobiinae
Noctuoidea genera